Lee Mi-kyung (born 27 March 1969) is a South Korean sport shooter who competed in the 1988 Summer Olympics.

References

1969 births
Living people
South Korean female sport shooters
ISSF rifle shooters
Olympic shooters of South Korea
Shooters at the 1988 Summer Olympics
Shooters at the 1998 Asian Games
Shooters at the 2002 Asian Games
Asian Games medalists in shooting
Asian Games gold medalists for South Korea
Asian Games silver medalists for South Korea
Medalists at the 2002 Asian Games
20th-century South Korean women
21st-century South Korean women